Satara railway station is the main railway station in the Satara district, in the city of Satara, Maharashtra. Its code is STR. The station lies on the Pune–Miraj line of the Central Railways and is administered by the Pune Railway Division.

Design 
The station consists of three platforms.

Connection 
This railway station connects Satara with major Indian cities such as  Mumbai, Pune, Bengaluru, Nagpur, Miraj, Kolhapur, Ahmedabad, Jaipur, Delhi, Goa, and Dhanbad through express trains.

There is need of Satara - Thoseghar or Kas - Chiplun new railway line from Koyna Wildlife Sanctuary. This line would connect Satara city with the Konkan region.

Also there is need of Satara - Pusegaon - Mhaswad - Pandharpur - Mohol - Solapur new railway line. This line would connect Satara city with pilgrimage centres such as Pandharpur and Gondavale and will also connect Satara with the city of Solapur via Mohol.

Passenger trains 

 Satara–Kolhapur
 Satara–Pune
 Pune–Kolhapur
 Kolhapur–Pune
 Proposed Satara Solapur railway  line

Express trains 
 Sri Ganganagar–Tiruchirappalli Humsafar Express
 Sahyadri Express
 Koyna Express
 Mahalaxmi Express
 Maharashtra Express
 Goa Express

References

Pune railway division
Railway stations in Satara district
Satara (city)